Ilmar Jaks (4 April 1923 Asuküla Parish, Lääne County – November 2019 Stockholm) was an Estonian writer. He is mostly known for his short stories.

From 1934 to 1941, he studied at Haapsalu Gymnasium. In 1941, he migrated to Finland, fighting in the Finnish Infantry Regiment 200. In 1945, he escaped to Sweden. In Sweden, he worked in the Swedish public office and worked also for his private law practice.

Works
 1958: short story collection "Aruanne" ('Report')
 1970: short story collection "Mapp" ('Folder')
 2003: short story collection "Pimedus" ('Darkness')

References

1923 births
2019 deaths
Estonian male short story writers
Estonian emigrants to Sweden